John McCarthy (born July 4, 1992) is an American professional soccer player who plays as a goalkeeper for Major League Soccer club Los Angeles FC.

Career

College and amateur
McCarthy played four years of college soccer at La Salle University between 2010 and 2013.

While at college, McCarthy also appeared for USL PDL clubs Ocean City Nor'easters in 2011 and 2012, and Reading United AC in 2013. He is La Salle's all-time leader among goalkeepers in saves (468), shutouts (28), and games played (75).

Professional

Rochester Rhinos
McCarthy signed his first professional deal with USL Pro club Rochester Rhinos on February 27, 2014.
After the 2014 season, McCarthy was named the Rhinos' Rookie of the Year as he led the league with a 0.72 goals against average.

McCarthy was named USL PRO Goalkeeper of the Year and USL PRO Rookie of the Year for his notable 2014 season performances.

Philadelphia Union

In 2015, McCarthy signed with his hometown club, Philadelphia Union. Originally signed as a third goalkeeper behind first round draft pick, Andre Blake, and designated player, Rais M'Bohli, McCarthy was given a starting role as a result of injury and poor form, respectively. He made his MLS debut as the starter for the Union on April 11, 2015, versus New York City FC. McCarthy was heralded for his performance which resulted in his first win in the top flight as well as the Union's first win of 2015 season. McCarthy started 8 league matches during the 2015 season, posting one shutout. He was played mostly during the Union's 2015 U.S. Open Cup run, earning wins in the first four rounds of competition (including two penalty shootouts) ultimately losing in the final. On July 6, 2017, McCarthy started in an away game against Sporting Kansas City which resulted in a 1–1 draw. McCarthy made five noteworthy saves in the game, including an excellent foot save on Latif Blessing in the 70th minute.

The conclusion of the 2018 season was also the end of McCarthy's Union contract, concluding his time with his hometown team.

Bethlehem Steel FC
For the 2016 season, McCarthy played on loan to the Union's USL club, Bethlehem Steel FC. He made 11 starts for the club and posted 5 shutouts for Steel FC's inaugural season.

Tampa Bay Rowdies
McCarthy signed with the Tampa Bay Rowdies on January 31, 2019. During his season with the Rowdies, McCarthy made 26 appearances and posted 10 clean sheets.

Inter Miami
In December 2019, McCarthy joined MLS expansion side Inter Miami CF ahead of their inaugural 2020 season. McCarthy made his debut for Miami on October 7, in a 2–1 victory over New York Red Bulls. Following the 2021 season, McCarthy's contract option was declined by Miami.

Los Angeles FC
On January 21, 2022, McCarthy joined Los Angeles FC for the 2022 season with an option for 2023. He entered the MLS Cup final against the Union for injured and sent-off goalkeeper Maxime Crépeau in the 117th minute and made two saves during the penalty shootout to win the title for LAFC. McCarthy was named the MLS Cup most valuable player as a result of his performance.

Career statistics

Honors
Los Angeles FC
MLS Cup: 2022
Supporters' Shield: 2022

Individual
United Soccer League Rookie of the Year: 2014
United Soccer League Goalkeeper of the Year: 2014
United Soccer League All-League First Team: 2014
MLS Cup MVP: 2022

References

External links

1992 births
Living people
American soccer players
La Salle Explorers men's soccer players
Ocean City Nor'easters players
Reading United A.C. players
Rochester New York FC players
Philadelphia Union players
Philadelphia Union II players
Tampa Bay Rowdies players
Inter Miami CF players
Los Angeles FC players
Association football goalkeepers
People from Cinnaminson Township, New Jersey
Soccer players from New Jersey
Sportspeople from Burlington County, New Jersey
USL League Two players
USL Championship players
Major League Soccer players